Jean Silvandre (27 January 1896 in Schœlcher, Martinique – 4 February 1960) was a politician from Martinique who represented and served French Sudan in the French National Assembly from 1946-1955 .

At the inception of partisan politics in the aftermath of the World War II, Jean Silvandre became the first president of the Association France-URSS, which held its first congress in Dakar, Senegal in early 1945.

References 
 page on the French National Assembly website
Joseph-Roger de Benoist. L'Afrique occidentale française de la Conférence de Brazzaville (1944) à l'indépendance (1960) webAfriqa

1896 births
1960 deaths
People from Schœlcher
Martiniquais politicians
French Section of the Workers' International politicians
Deputies of the 1st National Assembly of the French Fourth Republic
Deputies of the 2nd National Assembly of the French Fourth Republic